Maja Stipančević (born 7 May 1994) is a Croatian football forward, who plays for Viktorija.

Her older sister, Valentina, also played a number of matches for the Croatian football national team.

References

1994 births
Living people
Croatian women's footballers
Croatia women's international footballers
People from Nova Gradiška
Women's association football defenders
Croatian Women's First Football League players
ŽNK Viktorija Slavonski Brod players